Momote Airport  is an airport on Los Negros Island in the Admiralty Islands, Papua New Guinea. It also serves Manus Island, which is connected to Los Negros by a bridge.

History

Hayne Airfield
Built by the Imperial Japanese at Momote during World War II. Known as Hayne Airfield by the Japanese, as they called Los Negros, Hayne Island.

Occupied on 2 March 1944 by the US Army's 1st Cavalry Division as part of the Battle of Los Negros, which was part of the Admiralty Islands campaign.

Japanese Units based at Hayne Airfield
 63rd Sentai, 3rd Chutai (Ki-43)
 14th Sentai (Ki-21)

Momote Airfield
After liberating the airfield on 2 March 1944, the Seabees of the 40th Naval Construction Battalion repaired the airfield and the airfield became operational on 18 May 1944, although fighters were landing at the airfield only two days after occupation. A 7,000-barrel fuel depot was set up at the airfield. The United States Navy established Aviation Repair and Overhaul Unit No.1 (AROU 1) in the spring of 1944 on Momote Airfield between Seeadler Harbor and the Bismarck Sea on Los Negros Island. AROU 1 conducted maintenance and testing of naval aircraft and supplied aircraft to naval forces for major assaults as far away as the Philippine Islands.

Allied Units Based at Momote Airfield
 Headquarters, Thirteenth Air Force, (15 June-13 September 1944)
 Headquarters, XIII Bomber Command, (June-3 September 1944)
 5th Bomb Group Headquarters
 23d Bomb Squadron (B-24s)
 31st Bomb Squadron (B-24s)
 72d Bomb Squadron (B-24s)
 394th Bomb Squadron (B-24s)
 307th Bombardment Group, (13 AF) (29 April-24 August 1944)
 403d Troop Carrier Group, (13 AF) 30 August-4 October 1944
 Detachment, 419th Night Fighter Squadron, (13 AF) (27 June-18 August 1944)
 Aviation Repair and Overhaul Unit No.1 (AROU 1, USN) (est. late May 1944)
 No. 19 Squadron RNZAF (F4Us)
 No. 73 Wing RAAF
 No. 76 Squadron RAAF (Kittyhawks)
 No. 77 Squadron RAAF (Kittyhawks)
 No. 79 Squadron RAAF (Spitfires)
 No. 27 Air Stores Park RAAF
 No. 114 (Mobile) Fighter Sector Headquarters RAAF
 No. 346 Radar Station RAAF

Facilities
The airport can accommodate B737 operations and night operations.
The airport is sometimes used by private business jets as an alternative stop-over on the route between United States and India.

Airlines and destinations

See also

 USAAF in the Southwest Pacific
 Manus Island
 Admiralty Islands
 Manus Naval Base

References

External links
 Momote Airfield
 
 

Airports in Papua New Guinea
Airfields of the United States Army Air Forces in the South West Pacific theatre of World War II
Manus Province
Airfields of the United States Army Air Forces Air Transport Command in the South West Pacific Theater
Seabees
World War II sites in Papua New Guinea